{{DISPLAYTITLE:C17H19N3O}}
The molecular formula C17H19N3O (molar mass: 281.35 g/mol) may refer to:

 Phentolamine, a reversible nonselective Alpha-adrenergic antagonist
 Piberaline, a psychoactive drug

Molecular formulas